Cummings Creek is a stream in the U.S. state of West Virginia.

Cummings Creek was named after the local Cummings family.

See also
List of rivers of West Virginia

References

Rivers of Pocahontas County, West Virginia
Rivers of West Virginia